Perrotin may refer to:

Perrotin (Martian crater), a crater on Mars
1515 Perrotin, an asteroid
Emmanuel Perrotin (born 1968), art dealer
Henri Joseph Anastase Perrotin (1845–1904), French astronomer